This is a list of members of the Federal Retirement Thrift Investment Board.

The Federal Retirement Thrift Investment Board was created by the United States Congress in 1986 to manage the Thrift Savings Plan, the retirement plan for members of the uniformed services and Federal Government employees.

Chairmen of the Federal Retirement Thrift Investment Board (1986–present)

Executive Directors of the Federal Retirement Thrift Investment Board (1986–present)

Members of the Federal Retirement Thrift Investment Board (1986–present)

External links
Federal Retirement Thrift Investment Board